Jiří Srnec (29 August 1931 – 28 November 2021) was a Czech theatre director and artist.

References

1931 births
2021 deaths
Czech theatre directors
Academy of Performing Arts in Prague alumni
People from Prague-West District